Shardul Suresh Shroff is an Indian corporate lawyer. He is the executive chairman of the law firm Shardul Amarchand Mangaldas & Co. Prior to the split in the Amarchand & Mangaldas & Suresh A Shroff & Co", which was India's largest law firm, Shardul used to be the managing partner of the north India region of the firm headquartered in New Delhi.

Early life and education
Shroff completed his B.Com (Hons.) from Sydenham College, Mumbai and LL.B. from Government Law College, Mumbai.

Legal career

On 1 July 1980, Shroff was enrolled in the bar and he started his practice at Mumbai. He started to head the Delhi office of Amarchand & Mangaldas & Suresh A Shroff & Co in September 1980.

Past

Committee memberships
 Chair, Committee for Asset Valuation and Principles of Disposal of Corporate Properties, Assets and Shares; Indian government Ministry of Corporate Affairs
 Chair, Review of Offences and Penalties under the Company Law; Indian government Ministry of Corporate Affairs
 1996Dr. Jamshed J. Irani Committee for amending The Companies Act, 1956
 1996–97, 2000Securities and Exchange Board of India (SEBI)-appointed Bhagwati Committees for redrafting and modifying the SEBI Takeover Code
 Confederation of Indian Industry (CII) Task Force on Corporate Governance, which drafted the Corporate Governance Recommendations for Voluntary Adoption by directors
 second Naresh Chandra Committee appointed to look into aspects of small and medium enterprise and simplification of Company Law (LLPs and joint ventures)
 Dr. Amit Mitra Committee, appointed by the Ministry of Information and Broadcasting to revamp Radio Broadcast Policy, to recommend changes to license conditions for privatisation of the radio sector, and to propose a national broadcast regulator
 M. Damodaran – Federation of Indian Chambers of Commerce and Industry (FICCI) Committee on Corporate Governance

Current

Bar memberships
 Supreme Court Bar Association of India
 Delhi Bar Association
 International Bar Association (IBA)

He is an advocate-on-record of the Supreme Court of India.

Affiliations
Shroff is Associate President of Society of Indian Law Firms (SILF), a collective of India's top corporate law firms that has opposed entry of foreign law firms into India.

Personal life
Shardul Shroff is a grandson of Amarchand Shroff, who founded the law firm Amarchand & Mangaldas & Suresh A Shroff & Co in 1917. He is a son of Suresh A. Shroff, a former managing partner of the firm and Bharati Shroff, also the co-owner of the firm.

After the death of Bharti Shroff, the old firm was split into two with Shardul heading the Shardul Amarchand Mangaldas and brother Cyril Shroff heading the Cyril Amarchand Mangaldas.

Shroff is married to Pallavi Shroff, an advocate and daughter of former Chief Justice of India, PN Bhagwati. They have two daughters, Shweta Shroff and Natashaa Shroff.

References

20th-century Indian lawyers
Living people
Businesspeople from Delhi
Year of birth missing (living people)
Gujarati people
Indian corporate lawyers